Thomas Mathew (born 30 July 1961) is an Indian cricketer who has played 37 first-class matches between 1981 and 1990.

Mathew, a right handed batsman for Kerala, served the state as an opening batsman, and has scored over 1000 runs in Ranji Trophy. After his retirement, he represented the state as a selector of Kerala Cricket Association.

References

External links
 

1961 births
Living people
Kerala cricketers
Indian cricketers
South Zone cricketers
Cricketers from Kozhikode